Blind Spot is a 2012 Luxembourgian crime film directed by Christophe Wagner. The film was selected as the Luxembourgian entry for the Best Foreign Language Film at the 86th Academy Awards, but it was not nominated.

Cast
 Jules Werner as Olivier Faber
 André Jung as Inspector Hastert
 Brigitte Urhausen as Da Silva
 Gilles Soeder as Roehmer
 Luc Feit as Schroeder
 Nicole Max as Carnevale
 Mickey Hardt as Tom Faber
 Patrick Descamps as Beaulieue
 Stefan Weinert as Huremovic

See also
 List of submissions to the 86th Academy Awards for Best Foreign Language Film
 List of Luxembourgish submissions for the Academy Award for Best Foreign Language Film

References

External links
 

2012 films
2012 crime films
Luxembourgian crime films
Luxembourgish-language films